Clay Township is one of the fourteen townships of Auglaize County, Ohio, United States. The 2010 census found 817 people in the township.

Geography
Located in the eastern part of the county, it borders the following townships:
Union Township - north
Goshen Township - northeast
Stokes Township, Logan County - east
Jackson Township, Shelby County - south
Dinsmore Township, Shelby County - southwest corner
Pusheta Township - west
Duchouquet Township - northwest corner

No municipalities are located in Clay Township, although several unincorporated communities are located in the township:
Geyer, in the southwest
Saint Johns, along the northern border with Union Township
Santa Fe, along the southwestern border with Stokes Township, Logan County

Name and history
It is one of nine Clay Townships statewide.

The township was formed in 1836, while still a part of Allen County.

The township was also involved in one of the last county border changes in Ohio. This change occurred in 1888 when part of Stokes Township in Logan County was exchanged to Clay Township for part of Goshen Township, Auglaize County, Ohio.

Government
The township is governed by a three-member board of trustees, who are elected in November of odd-numbered years to a four-year term beginning on the following January 1. Two are elected in the year after the presidential election and one is elected in the year before it. There is also an elected township fiscal officer, who serves a four-year term beginning on April 1 of the year after the election, which is held in November of the year before the presidential election. Vacancies in the fiscal officership or on the board of trustees are filled by the remaining trustees.

Public services
The Wapakoneta City School District encompasses a large part of the township, with small portions in the southeast served by the Jackson Center Local School District and the Indian Lake Local School District. The extreme northeastern section of the township is served by the Waynesfield-Goshen Local School District.

Most of the township is served by the Wapakoneta (45895) post office, except for a small section in the south served by the Jackson Center (45334) post office.

References

External links
County website

Townships in Auglaize County, Ohio
1836 establishments in Ohio
Populated places established in 1836
Townships in Ohio